Brzozie may refer to various places in Poland:

Brzozie, Brodnica County
Brzozie, Tuchola County
Brzozie Lubawskie
Gmina Brzozie